The 2020 Monaghan Senior Football Championship will be the 114th edition of Monaghan GAA's premier gaelic football tournament for senior clubs in County Monaghan, Ireland. Ten teams compete, with the winners not representing Monaghan in the AIB GAA Ulster Club Senior Football Championship due to the latter competition's cancellation. Generally, the championship uses a double-elimination format for Rounds 1 and 2 before becoming knock-out. However, for this season due to the COVID-19 pandemic, a round-robin system splitting the 10 senior clubs into two groups of five was used. 

Clontibret O'Neills are the defending champions after defeating Scotstown in the 2019 final. 
The 2019 competition also sees the return of Magheracloone Mitchell's and Donaghmoyne to the Senior ranks following their promotion from the Intermediate competition.  

Usually, relegation is based on a team's performance in the Senior Football League, but due to the cancellation of this year's league, a Relegation Final contested by the two bottom placed finishers in both groups was implemented. TBD were relegated to the 2021 I.F.C. after they lost the Relegation Final to ???. They'll be replaced by TBD, this year's I.F.C. Champions.

Team Changes
Prior to 2020, the two bottom-placed teams in the Monaghan Senior Football League are relegated to the Intermediate ranks for the following season, with the Intermediate Football Championship winners and Intermediate Football League winners promoted in their place. If a team wins both the Intermediate Championship and League, then the next highest placed team in the League will be promoted.

The following teams have changed division since the 2019 championship season.

To S.F.C.
Promoted from 2019 Monaghan I.F.C.
 Magheracloone Mitchell's - (I.F.C. Champions)
 Donaghmoyne -  (I.F.L. Champions)

From S.F.C.
Relegated to 2020 Monaghan I.F.C.
 Doohamlet O'Neill's (9th in League)
 Currin (10th in League)

Participating Teams

Group stage 

There are two groups of five teams called Group A and B. The 1st placed team in each group qualify for the semi-finals. 2nd and 3rd qualify for the quarter-finals while the 4th and 5th placed teams proceed to the relegation play-offs. 

The draw for the group stages of the championship were made on 3 July 2020 with the games commencing on 25 July 2020. Teams named first in the group stage had home advantage.

Group A

Round 1
 Ballybay 1-9, 1-9 Clontibret, 26/7/2020,
 Inniskeen 1-11, 2-9 Magheracloone, 26/7/2020,
 Donaghmoyne - Bye,

Round 2
 Magheracloone 1-9, 1-12 Ballybay, 1/8/2020,
 Donaghmoyne 1-6, 0-13 Inniskeen, 1/8/2020,
 Clontibret - Bye,

Round 3
 Clontibret 0-13, 0-13 Magheracloone, 9/8/2020,
 Ballybay 4-20, 0-8 Donaghmoyne, 9/8/2020,
 Inniskeen - Bye,

Round 4
 Donaghmoyne 2-11, 2-11 Clontibret, 15/8/2020,
 Inniskeen 0-14, 2-9 Ballybay, 15/8/2020,
 Magheracloone - Bye,

Round 5
 Clontibret 0-11, 2-8 Inniskeen, 21/8/2020,
 Magheracloone 1-16, 2-7 Donaghmoyne, 21/8/2020,
 Ballybay - Bye,

Group B

Round 1
 Scotstown 0-17, 1-12 Truagh, 25/7/2020,
 Castleblayney 0-9, 1-13 Latton, 25/7/2020,
 Carrickmacross - Bye,

Round 2
 Carrickmacross 1-12, 0-8 Castleblayney, 2/8/2020,
 Latton 0-8, 0-12 Scotstown, 2/8/2020,
 Truagh - Bye,

Round 3
 Truagh 4-17, 0-6 Latton, 8/8/2020,
 Scotstown 2-15, 0-7 Carrickmacross, 8/8/2020,
 Castleblayney - Bye,

Round 4
 Castleblayney 0-13, 1-13 Scotstown, 16/8/2020,
 Carrickmacross 0-12, 1-10 Truagh, 16/8/2020,
 Latton - Bye,

Round 5
 Truagh -vs- Castleblayney, 23/8/2020,
 Latton -vs- Carrickmacross, 23/8/2020,
 Scotstown - Bye,

Quarter-finals
The four 2nd and 3rd placed teams from Groups A and B enter the quarter-finals. The two losers are eliminated.

Semi-finals
The two 1st placed teams from Groups A and B play against the two Quarter-Final winners.

Final

Relegation play-offs

Relegation Semi-Finals

The two 1st placed teams from Groups A and B play against the two Quarter-Final winners.

Relegation Final

References

Monaghan Senior Football Championship
Monaghan Senior Football Championship
Monaghan Senior Football Championship
Monaghan Senior Football Championship